The 2019 Dallas Fuel season was the second season of the Dallas Fuel's existence in the Overwatch League and was their first full season under head coach Aaron "Aero" Atkins. The team looked to improve on their disappointing 12–28 record from 2018, where they did not qualify for the season playoffs.

Dallas began the season posting an impressive 4–2 record through six games, but a 2–3 loss to the Boston Uprising eliminated the team from Stage 1 Playoff contention. The team hit their stride in Stage 2, amassing a 5–2 record, and qualified for the Stage 2 Playoffs. However, they were knocked out in the quarterfinals round by the Vancouver Titans in a 0–3 loss. The Fuel fell apart in the final half of the season, finding only one win in their final fourteen matches. With a 10–18 record for the season, the Fuel again did not qualify for the season playoffs.

Preceding offseason

Player re-signings 
From August 1 to September 9, 2018, all Overwatch League teams that competed in the 2018 season could choose to extend their team's players' contracts. Along with the retirement of star tank player Brandon "Seagull" Larned, Fuel released support Sebastian "Chipshajen" Widlund and tank Christian "cocco" Jonsson.

Free agency 
All non-expansion teams could not enter the free agency period until October 8, 2018; they were able to sign members from their respective academy team and make trades until then. On October 15, Fuel acquired Jung "Closer" Won-sik from London Spitfire; Closer signed with Fuel on a two-way contract with Team Envy. On November 11, Fuel signed off-tank Richard "rCk" Kanerva from Overwatch Contenders team Team Gigantti to a two-year contract. Fuel's final offseason transaction was on December 3, when the team signed former Fusion University and United States Overwatch World Cup team player Zachary "ZachaREEE" Lombardo.

Regular season

Stage 1 
Dallas began their 2019 season splitting their two matches in week one – a 0–4 loss against San Francisco Shock and a 3–1 win over Seoul Dynasty. The team repeated their inconsistent performance the following week, as Fuel fell 0–4 to Guangzhou Charge and defeated Philadelphia Fusion 3–1. After a pair of wins against Shanghai Dragons, Fuel took on Boston Uprising in their final match of the stage. Dallas took the first two maps of the match, but Boston was able to engineer a reverse sweep, placing Fuel at a 4–3 Stage 1 record and one match out from the Stage 1 Playoffs.

Stage 2 

Dallas had a multitude of player and coaching changes at the start of Stage 2. On April 2, Dallas traded Richard "rCk" Kanerva to Boston Uprising in exchange for Lucas "NotE" Meissner. On the same day, assistant coach Christian "cocco" Jonsson retired from the Overwatch League; Dallas signed former Paris Eternal head coach Julien "daemoN" Ducros as an assistant coach a day later. Three days later, Fuel's Hyeon "EFFECT" Hwang retired from professional Overwatch due to mental health issues.

Fuel's first two matches of Stage 2 were not until week two, where Dallas swept Toronto Defiant 4–0 and edged over Paris Eternal 2–1. Week three was not as fortunate for Dallas, as the team was swept 0–4 by both Vancouver Titans and Seoul Dynasty. Fuel took both of their matches in their "Dallas Fuel Homestand Week", defeating Los Angeles Valiant and in-state rivals Houston Outlaws and clinching a Stage 2 Playoff berth. Dallas capped off the regular season of Stage 2 with a win over Florida Mayhem, ending the stage with a 5–2 record and the sixth seed in the Stage 2 Playoffs.

Two days before their Quarterfinal match against the undefeated Vancouver Titans, Fuel promoted Ashley "Trill" Powell form their academy team Team Envy. Dallas was not able to put up much of a challenge for Titans, as Fuel was swept 0–3 in the match.

Homestand Weekend 
Week four saw the "Dallas Fuel Homestand Weekend" – the first of three Overwatch League "Homestand Weekends" of the 2019 season. The two-day event, which took place at the Allen Event Center in Allen, Texas, sold out 4,500 seats each day. Held in part to test whether or not the league's plan to hold matches locally, Dallas Fuel was responsible for every aspect of the weekend aside from the broadcast, which was aired on ESPN2. During the first match of the weekend,  a regional power outage delayed the event for 45 minutes. Marking the highest viewership of Stage 2, the homestand showed that the local-match model has promise.

Stage 3 

Dallas opened Stage 3 on June 7 with a match against the Los Angeles Gladiators. The Fuel could not find a footing throughout the match, and was swept 0–4. Dallas turned it around two days later with a 3–0 victory over the Washington Justice. Notably, Dylan "aKm" Bignet tied an Overwatch League record set by Kelsey "Colourhex" Birse for highest average energy on Zarya in at map at 82%. The following week, the Fuel first took on the Chengdu Hunters on June 13. Dallas was unable to adapt to the off-meta compositions ran by the Hunters and lost the match 1–3. Two days later, the team faced the undefeated Vancouver Titans; the Fuel were dominated throughout the match and were swept 0–4.

The Fuel's struggles continued the following week, losing 0–3 to the Hangzhou Spark in a match where the Dallas roster looked to be falling apart. Three days later, the Fuel were swept 4–0 by the Hunters in a rematch of the previous week. Dallas' final match of the stage was against the New York Excelsior on June 29. After winning the first two maps, Dallas look primed to take a win from New York, but the Excelsior made the proper adjustments after halftime, and completing a reverse sweep by taking three consecutive maps to hand Dallas a 2–3 loss.

Stage 4 
The Fuel's first match of Stage 4, along with the first match with an enforced 2-2-2 role lock by the League, was against the London Spitfire on July 26. Dallas' tank line and DPS were outplayed that of London's, as the team fell in a 1–3 loss. The following week, the team lost to the Los Angeles Valiant by a 1–3 scoreline. Trying to find wins to realistically keep their playoff hopes alive, the Fuel took on the Los Angeles Gladiators on August 9. Dallas found themselves up 2–0 going into halftime, but the team crumbled thereafter, losing three consecutive maps to fall 2–3. Two days later, the team was swept 0–4 by the San Francisco Shock in a match that was as close as the scoreline. The following week, the Fuel fell to the Hangzhou Spark by a score of 1–3. The team's next match was against the Guangzhou Charge on August 18. Dallas found another loss in the matchup, as they were swept 0–4. Notably, an in-game bug cause an hour-long delay in the final map of the series – the longest delay in Overwatch League history. Officially eliminated from season playoff contention, the Fuel headed to The Novo in Los Angeles to play in the Kit Kat Rivalry Weekend, hosted by the Los Angeles Valiant. Their only match of the weekend was against the Atlanta Reign August 24. After the Reign took the first map with little resistance, both teams completed Volskaya Industries twice, to push the map to a second overtime round, but Dallas came out victorious, tying the series 1–1. Coming out of halftime, close losses on King's Row and Havana gave Dallas a 1–3 match loss. The loss ended Dallas' season with a 12-match losing streak.

Final roster

Transactions 
Transactions of/for players on the roster during the 2019 regular season:
On April 2, Fuel traded Richard "rCk" Kanerva to Boston Uprising in exchange for Lucas "NotE" Meissner.
On April 6, Hwang "EFFECT" Hyeon retired.
On May 7, Fuel promoted Ashley "Trill" Powell from Team Envy.

Standings

Record by stage

League

Game log

Regular season

Playoffs

References 

2019 Overwatch League seasons by team
Dallas Fuel
Dallas Fuel seasons